John T. Campbell served in the California legislature and, during the American Civil War, he served in the United States Army.

References

1800s births
Year of birth missing
Place of birth missing
19th-century deaths
Year of death missing
Place of death missing
Members of the California State Legislature
Union Army personnel
19th-century American politicians